ACCE may refer to:

Academy for College and Career Exploration
Access Bank plc, a bank which trades on the Nigerian Stock Exchange as ACCE
African Center for Community Empowerment
American City County Exchange, a division of the American Legislative Exchange Council